The Gilmore Artist Award is awarded every four years to a concert pianist. The award was established in 1989 by The Gilmore of Kalamazoo, Michigan.

Selection criteria
In contrast with other music awards, nominees are not aware that they are under consideration, but are assessed discreetly over a period of time through live performances and recordings. The prize money is $300,000, of which $50,000 to be spent as the winner desires and $250,000 to be used for career development.

Previous winners
1991 – David Owen Norris (England)
1994 – Ralf Gothóni (Finland)
1998 – Leif Ove Andsnes (Norway)
2002 – Piotr Anderszewski (Poland)
2006 – Ingrid Fliter (Argentina)
2010 – Kirill Gerstein (Russia)
2014 – Rafał Blechacz (Poland)
2018 – Igor Levit (Russia/Germany)

Gilmore Young Artist Award
Every two years, the Gilmore Young Artist Award is presented to promising pianists below age 23.  An anonymous selection committee receives and evaluates nominations by music professionals from around the world.  As with the Gilmore Artist Award, the nominees are not aware that they are being considered.  Awardees receive a $15,000 stipend and another $10,000 to commission an original piano composition that they will have the exclusive right to perform for one year.

The award was first granted in 1991. 38 pianists have received a Gilmore Young Artists Award.

References

External links
 
 Gilmore Young Artist Award.
American music awards
1989 establishments in Michigan